Bangladesh Competition Commission is a Bangladesh government statutory body responsible for encouraging competition in the market. Mr. Pradip Ranjan Chakraborty, former Secretary of the Planning Division is the Chairperson of Bangladesh Competition Commission. He joined this position on 8th November 2022.

History
Bangladesh Competition Commission was established in 17 December 2012 as per provision of The Competition Act, 2012 in the Parliament of Bangladesh. The Act repealed and replaced the Monopolies and Restrictive Trade Practices Ordinance, 1970. The purpose of the Commission is to prevent, control and eradicate collusion, monopoly and oligopoly, combination or abuse of dominant position or activities adverse to the competition. The commission consists of a Chairperson and not more than 4 (four) members. Among them at least 3 persons will make a quorum. It is responsible for compliance of the Competition Act, 2012.

References

1976 establishments in Bangladesh
Organisations based in Dhaka
Government agencies of Bangladesh